Stanley or Stan Moore may refer to:

 Stanley Moore (cricketer) (1886–1948), Australian cricketer
 Stanley Moore (politician), American politician
 Stanley Moore (water polo), Irish Olympic water polo player
 Stan Moore (director) (born 1956), American film director, screenwriter, and producer
 Stan Moore (ice hockey), American ice hockey player and coach